Helmut Gams (1893–1976) was a central European botanist. Born in Brno, he moved to Zürich as a child. He studied at the University of Zurich, being awarded a PhD in 1918. During his career, he worked at the University of Munich and the University of Innsbruck. His research saw him pursue fieldwork around Europe and Asia. He was a geobotanist who specialized in the associations of different species of mosses and lichens with each other and the environment. Gams coined the terms 'biocoenology' and 'phytocoenology' in his 1918 PhD thesis.

Two species named after Gams are Phacus gamsii and Rumex gamsii.

References

1893 births
1976 deaths
Scientists from Zürich
People from the Margraviate of Moravia
20th-century botanists
Lichenologists
Bryologists
University of Zurich alumni
Academic staff of the Ludwig Maximilian University of Munich
Academic staff of the University of Innsbruck
Austro-Hungarian emigrants to Switzerland